Graham Webster (born 15 May 1992) is a Scottish football midfielder, who plays for Montrose.

Career

Dundee
A member of the Dundee under-19 squad and with Dundee in administration and relying on youth Webster made his first team debut on 10 April 2011 against Stirling Albion from the start. He made two further appearances that season one as a substitute and played the full 90 minutes on the closing day of the season. Webster signed a new one-year contract extension in May 2011.

Career statistics

References

1992 births
Living people
Scottish footballers
Scottish Football League players
Dundee F.C. players
Association football midfielders
Peterhead F.C. players
Montrose F.C. players
Scottish Professional Football League players